Agata Bronisława Buzek (born 20 September 1976) is a Polish actress and model.

Agata, the daughter of Polish politician, former Prime Minister of Poland and President of the European Parliament Jerzy Buzek, was born in Pyskowice in Gliwice County, Poland. At an early age she had poliomyelitis and was treated in Germany. After studying at a theatre academy in Warsaw, she went to Paris where she worked as a model.

Buzek has won the Polish Academy Award for Best Supporting Actress in 2003 and the Shooting Stars Award at the 60th Berlin International Film Festival.

Selected filmography 
 The Supplement (2002) as a fashion model
 The Revenge (2002) as Klara
 The Hexer (2002) as Pavetta
  (2006) as Valerie
 Tajemnica twierdzy szyfrów  (2007) as Kerstin Nowolk
 Reverse (2009) as Sabina
 Hummingbird (2013) (Redemption in the US) as Sister Cristina
 Obce Ciało (2014) as Katarzyna
 Fotograf (2015) as Kasia Przybylska
 11 Minutes (2015) as a climber
 The Innocents (2016) as Sister Maria
 High Life (2018) as Nansen
 The Pit (2020)
 Moje wspaniałe życie (2022)

References

External links 

 

1976 births
People from Gliwice
Living people
People from Pyskowice
Polish film actresses
Polish voice actresses
20th-century Polish actresses
21st-century Polish actresses
Polish female models
Aleksander Zelwerowicz National Academy of Dramatic Art in Warsaw alumni
Daughters of national leaders